Vidyavardhaka College of Engineering (VVCE) is a premier autonomous institute under VTU  situated in Gokulam, Mysuru, Karnataka, India. As an autonomous institution, it follows the guidelines set by Visvesvaraya Technological University. It offers courses on Computer science, Information science, Artificial Intelligence & Machine Learning, Electronics and Communication, Electrical and Electronics, Civil engineering, Mechanical engineering.

Description 

Vidyavardhaka College of Engineering is recognized by the Government of Karnataka and the All India Council for Technical Education. Programs of study offered include bachelor's degrees in mechanical, electronics, computer science, information sciences, Artificial Intelligence & Machine Learning and electrical engineering. Six programs, IS&E, E&EE, CS&E, E&CE, ME and CV of VVCE have been accredited by National Board of Accreditation for three years i.e. academic years 2020-2021 to 2022-2023 of date up to 30 June 2023. The college is also accredited with 'A' Grade by National Assessment and Accreditation Council (NAAC) for five Years from the year 2018.  The college was founded by the Vidyavrdhaka Sangha in 1997.

Academic programs 

Courses offered:

Undergraduate programs
 Artificial Intelligence & Machine Learning
Civil Engineering
Computer Science & Engineering
Electrical & Electronics Engineering
Electronics & Communication Engineering
Information Science & Engineering
 Mechanical Engineering

Postgraduate programs
 Master of Business Administration
 M.Tech
 Machine Design
 Computer Science & Engineering

Campus 
The campus is designed with the main preference to the Computer Science and Electrical Engineering departments, both of which are close to the main gate of the building. The mechanical department is offset for some distance from the main building.

It has a basketball court, Indoor sports complex and large ground which acts as a stadium for cricket, football and concerts. Concerts for various college festivals are held in the same ground.

External links 

 Vidyavardhaka College of Engineering Website

Engineering colleges in Karnataka
1997 establishments in Karnataka
Educational institutions established in 1997